Orlando Polmonari (11 March 1924 – 27 August 2014) was an Italian gymnast. He won a bronze medal in the all-around with the Italian national team at the 1960 Summer Olympics. He was born and died in Ferrara, Italy.

References

External links
 

1924 births
2014 deaths
Italian male artistic gymnasts
Gymnasts at the 1960 Summer Olympics
Gymnasts at the 1952 Summer Olympics
Olympic gymnasts of Italy
Olympic bronze medalists for Italy
Olympic medalists in gymnastics
Medalists at the 1960 Summer Olympics